Benjamin Booker is the debut studio album by American musician Benjamin Booker. It was released on 9 August 2014 by ATO Records and Rough Trade Records.

Recording and production
The album was recorded in December 2013 in engineer/producer Andrija Tokic's all-analog Bomb Shelter in East Nashville, Andrija Tokic who has produced recordings for Hurray for the Riff Raff and Alabama Shakes. The Bomb shelter was recommend to Booker as a place to record his album by Alynda Lee Segarra of Hurray for the Riff Raff and by Sam Doores of The Deslondes. Booker chose The Bomb Shelter as the place to record his album, as he wanted to record the album in analog like he stated in an interview: "

Booker arrived for the recording of the album with his only band mate, Max Norton, from Tampa, FL. The recording of the album was done using a RCA overhead on Norton’s kit, a Neumann U 87 on kick, and a Shure 57 on snare. Booker’s vocal chain usually included a Neumann U 67 with an Altec tube preamp and a UA 175 compressor, recording was often done with other instruments such as Sennheiser 441, in rotation to the main instruments used. the main guitars used for recording were 60s hollow-body Super Lynx Deluxe Vox, and an ’80s Ibanez Matsumoku Roadster. After recording started Tokic started bring in bass players and keyboardists to "flesh out recordings". The album was mixed on Tokic's MCI JH600 console.

Reception

Upon its release Benjamin Booker's self-titled album Benjamin Booker received critical acclaim. At Metacritic, which assigns a normalized rating out of 100 to reviews from mainstream critics, the album received an average score of 81, based on 15 reviews, which indicates "universal acclaim".

Track listing

Personnel
Credits adapted from AllMusic.
John Baldwin – mastering
Benjamin Booker – bass, composer, guitar, primary artist, vocals
Jem Cohen – bass, vocals 
Eduardo Duquesne – bass, vocals 
Mitch Jones	 – organ
Rob Jones – design
Peter Keys – Fender Rhodes, organ
Max Norton	– drums, organ, mandolin, photography
Andrija Tokic – engineer, mixing, producer
Ben Trimble	– bass, mellotron

Charts

References

2014 debut albums
Rough Trade Records albums